Dowlatabad (also Romanized as Dowlatābād; also known as Dowlarābād and Dowlatābād-e Bahrāmjerd) is a village in Negar Rural District, in the Central District of Bardsir County, Kerman Province, Iran. At the 2006 census, its population was 148, in 35 families.

References 

Populated places in Bardsir County